Dennis Fields (born May 2, 1945) is an American politician in the state of New Hampshire. He is a member of the New Hampshire House of Representatives, sitting as a Republican from the Belknap 4 district, having been first elected in 2008. He previously served from 1982 to 2004.

References

Living people
1945 births
Republican Party members of the New Hampshire House of Representatives
People from Sanbornton, New Hampshire
20th-century American politicians
21st-century American politicians